The Journal of the Science of Food and Agriculture is a peer-reviewed scientific journal. It was established in 1950 and is published 15 times a year by John Wiley & Sons on behalf of the Society of Chemical Industry.
The journal is included in the Index Medicus (MEDLINE).

References

External links 
 

Agricultural journals
Chemical industry in the United Kingdom
Wiley (publisher) academic journals
Publications established in 1950
English-language journals
1950 establishments in the United Kingdom
Journals published between 13 and 25 times per year